Joe Girling is a British racing driver who competed in the British Touring Car Championship in 2013 for Tech-Speed Motorsport, under the M247 Racing banner.

Career
In 2011, Girling entered the Renault Clio Cup Trophy, a two-race event held at Rockingham. He finished fifth in the first race, and fourth in the second, driving a Stancombe Vehicle Engineering-entered car.

In March 2013, it was announced that Girling would be driving for Tech-Speed Motorsport in the British Touring Car Championship, driving a Super 2000-class Chevrolet Cruze. He made his début in the series at the opening round, held at Brands Hatch's Indy Circuit. He sat out the first two races due to a broken driveshaft, before finishing eighteenth overall in the third race of the day. At Donington Park, he took his first victory in the Jack Sears Trophy, following a series of retirements in the class, in the third race of the day. Thruxton proved to be less successful, with his best result being third in class in race one. He withdrew from the Oulton Park round of the series for medical reasons, and missed the races at Croft due to an accident in qualifying. He also missed the round at Snetterton. Prior to the Knockhill round he decided to take a sabbatical from the BTCC.

Racing record

Complete British Touring Car Championship results
(key) (Races in bold indicate pole position – 1 point awarded just in first race) (Races in italics indicate fastest lap – 1 point awarded all races) (* signifies that driver lead race for at least one lap – 1 point given all races)

References

External links
Profile at btcc.net

Living people
British Touring Car Championship drivers
British racing drivers
1990 births